Mainstream of Jazz is an album led by American jazz baritone saxophonist Gerry Mulligan with tracks recorded in 1956 which were released by EmArcy.

Reception

Allmusic awarded the album 4 stars stating "this was a classic West Coast style jazz band and each of its recordings are worth acquiring".

Track listing
All compositions by Gerry Mulligan except as indicated
 "Elevation" (Elliot Lawrence, Mulligan) - 6:51   
 "Mainstream" - 6:49   
 "Ain't It the Truth" (Count Basie) - 5:23   
 "Igloo" (Jerry Lloyd) - 6:57   
 "Blue at the Roots" - 5:46   
 "Lollypop"  (Chico Hamilton, Gerald Wiggins) - 5:48  
Recorded in New York City on January 25, 1956 (tracks 2 & 3) and September 26, 1956 (tracks 1 & 4-6)

Personnel 
 Gerry Mulligan – baritone saxophone, piano
 Jon Eardley – trumpet
 Don Ferrara – trumpet
 Bob Brookmeyer – valve trombone
 Zoot Sims – tenor saxophone
 Bill Crow – double bass
 Dave Bailey – drums

References 

1956 albums
Gerry Mulligan albums
EmArcy Records albums